High fantasy is a subgenre of fantasy fiction. This term may also refer to:
 High Fantasy (film) (2017) directed by Jenna Bass
 High Fantasy (role-playing game) (1978) published by Fantasy Productions